The 2016 World Taekwondo Grand Prix was the 4th edition of the World Taekwondo Grand Prix. As 2016 was an Olympic year, unlike in 2015, the series consisted of a single Grand Prix Final event, and was held in Baku, Azerbaijan from 9 to 10 December 2016. Contests were held over the eight Olympic weight categories, rather than the full sixteen categories employed at World Championships level

Medal summary

Men

Women

Medal table

References

External links
WTF Official website

World Taekwondo Grand Prix
Grand Prix